Tumelo Mangweni (born 22 August 1994) is a South African professional soccer player who played as a midfielder for Bloemfontein Celtic.

References

1994 births
Living people
South African soccer players
Association football midfielders
Bloemfontein Celtic F.C. players
South African Premier Division players